"Sober" is a song by American singer Demi Lovato. It was initially released exclusively to music streaming services through Island, Hollywood and Safehouse Records on June 21, 2018, and was made available to iTunes on the same day. Lovato revealed in the song that she had relapsed after six years of sobriety. A month after the song's release, Lovato was hospitalized due to an overdose.

Commercially, the song reached the top 40 in Ireland, Portugal and Hungary, and was certified gold in the United States and Portugal.

Recording
The track was written and recorded during the 2018 Bali Invitational songwriting camp. Lovato set up a house with songwriters Romans, Apte and Landon in three writing rooms. "I feel like we created such a safe place for that song to happen and she was so brutally honest about everything," revealed Apte in an interview.

Release and promotion
"Sober" premiered on June 21, 2018, and was released commercially for digital download at the same time. The lyric video begins with various clips of Lovato, including one where she is holding a wine glass, followed by footage of an ambulance. In an Instagram post, the singer teased the track with a clip of a lyric video and a short caption that read, "My truth."

Live performances
Lovato first performed the song during her show at Rock in Rio in Lisbon, on June 24, 2018. She posted footage from the LiveXLive livestream of her performance on Instagram and Twitter, and wrote: "Tonight I took the stage, a new person with a new life." She subsequently performed the song during the Tell Me You Love Me World Tour after "Warrior" was performed, during the shows in London and Birmingham. An orchestral version of the song was arranged and directed by the composer Alfredo Sirica.

Credits and personnel
Credits adapted from Qobuz.

 Tushar Apte – producer, composer, lyricist
 Mitch Allan – vocal producer, engineer
 William Binderup – assistant mixer
 Demi Lovato – composer, lyricist
 M-Phazes (Mark Landon) – producer, composer, lyricist
 Erik Madrid – mixer
 Rafe Noonan – assistant engineer
 Romans (Sam Roman) – keyboards, programmer, composer, lyricist, producer, background vocalist

Charts

Certifications

References

External links

2010s ballads
2018 singles
2018 songs
Demi Lovato songs
Hollywood Records singles
Island Records singles
Safehouse Records singles
Songs written by Demi Lovato
Songs written by Romans (musician)
Songs written by M-Phazes
Songs written by Tushar Apte